Ishaara may refer to:

Ishaara (1943 film), Indian film
Ishaara (1964 film), Indian film

People
Ishaara Nair